Lanistes neavei is a species of large freshwater snail, an aquatic gastropod mollusk with a gill and an operculum in the family Ampullariidae, the apple snails.

It is found in the Democratic Republic of the Congo and Zambia.

References

Ampullariidae
Gastropods described in 1907
Taxonomy articles created by Polbot